Colonia Valdense is a small city located in southwestern Uruguay, within the Colonia Department. It is home to around 3,200 people.

Geography

History 
Colonia Valdense was founded in 1856 (officially as "Valdense"), following the arrival of Italian immigrants from Piedmont, especially from the Waldensian Valleys and the Aosta Valley. The town is named after Pierre Valdo, a French merchant, founder of the religious movement known as "The Waldensians". The Waldensian Evangelical Church, which is now a Protestant church, has a strong presence here.

Language 
Spoken dialect was the Patois, which was an occitan dialect spoken in the town of Villar Pellice in Italy from where the settlers were originated. The dialect was spoken mainly in the Colonia Department, where the first pilgrims settled, in the city called La Paz, Colonia. Today it is considered a dead language, although some elders at the mentioned location still practice it. There are still written tracts of the language in the Waldensians Library (Biblioteca Valdense) in the town of Colonia Valdense, Colonia Department.
Patois speaker arrived to Uruguay from the Piedmont. They were Waldensians, members of the oldest Protestant church in Italy, giving their name to the city Colonia Valdense which translated from the Spanish means Waldensians Colony.

Its status was elevated to "Pueblo" (village) on 6 November 1951 by the Act of Ley N° 11.742. On 24 September 1982, it was renamed to "Colonia Valdense" and its status was elevated to "Ciudad" (city) by the Act of Decreto-Ley N° 15.323.

Population 
According to the 2011 census, Colonia Valdense had a population of 3,235.
 
Source: Instituto Nacional de Estadística de Uruguay

Places of worship
 Waldensian Temple (Waldensians)
 Our Lady of Fatima Chapel (Roman Catholic)

Twin towns 
Luserna San Giovanni,

References

External links 
 Information about Colonia Valdense at Multimedia Uruguay portal cultural 
INE map of Colonia Valdense
Linguistic Book, published by University of the Republic (Uruguay)
 

Populated places established in 1856
Populated places in the Colonia Department
Waldensianism